Ferritin light chain is a protein that in humans is encoded by the FTL gene.  Ferritin is the major protein responsible for storing intracellular iron in prokaryotes and eukaryotes. It is a heteropolymer consisting of 24 subunits, heavy and light ferritin chains. This gene has multiple pseudogenes.

It is abnormally expressed in fetuses of both IVF and ICSI, which may contribute to the increase risk of birth defects in these assisted reproductive technologies.

Function 

Iron is extremely important in the development of neurons, transport through iron-sulfur clusters, the electron transport chain, and synthesis and breakdown of neurotransmitters. The function of the FTL is to act as both an iron reservoir and to remove excess iron from the body. Since iron plays a role in electron transfer, there is potential for the generation of free, highly toxic radicals which makes the role of the FTL as an iron detoxifier very significant. The rates of iron uptake and release may be affected by changes to the components of the ferritin light chains and heavy chains. Although the ferritin light chain unlike the ferritin heavy chain has no ferroxidase activity, the light chain may be responsible for the electron transfer across the ferritin protein cage.

Clinical significance 

Oxidative stress caused by iron radicals generated in the ETC and an increase in iron levels caused by defects in the FTL gene has been known to be a cause of the onset of neurodegenerative diseases and hyperferritinemia-cataract syndrome.

Mutations of the FTL gene cause the rare adult-onset basal ganglia disease also known as neuroferritinopathy. These mutations are specifically in exon four of the FTL gene. There are two distinct toxic mechanisms that lead to neuroferritinopathy and these are abnormalities in iron metabolism and the creation of free iron radicals, resulting in oxidative stress and cell death.

Interactions 
Ferritin light chain has been shown to interact with FTH1. An oxygen molecule acts as the terminal electron acceptor during the oxidation of iron in aerobic metabolism. A study conducted with different apoferritins with distinct compositions of heavy and light subunits revealed that both subunits have key roles in the electron transport chain. Neither subunit on its own has the ability to reduce cytochrome c and thus the first step, the oxidation of Fe2+ to Fe3+, can be carried out by the heavy chain and the light chains are responsible for the transfer of electrons.

FTL is regulated by iron and with an increase in iron, there is both an increase in the FTL expression and PEN-2 levels, which results in increased γ- secretase activity. In relation to this, the downregulation of FTL expression leads to a decrease in the protein levels of PEN-2.

See also 
 Ferritin

References

Further reading

External links 
  GeneReviews/NCBI/NIH/UW entry on Neuroferritinopathy